Future Primitive: The New Ecotopias is a 1994 collection of short stories edited by Kim Stanley Robinson.  It republishes notable short works of utopian and dystopian fiction that incorporate elements of primitivism and of eco-anarchism.

Contents 
An introduction by Robinson, outlining the visionary role of such fiction
Tomorrow's Song, Gary Snyder (a poem)
Part one:  "Statements of desire"
Bears Discover Fire, Terry Bisson
In the Abode of the Snows, Pat Murphy
Boomer Flats, R. A. Lafferty
Part two:  "Denial of the body"
Hogfoot Right and Bird-Hands, Garry Kilworth
Part three:  "But what were they really like?"
House of Bones, Robert Silverberg
Part four:  "And might we ever be like that again?"
'A Story' by John V. Marsch, Gene Wolfe
The Bead Woman, Rachel Pollack
Chocco, Ernest Callenbach
(excerpt from) The New World, Frederick Turner
Rangriver Fell, Paul Park
Mary Margaret Road-Grade, Howard Waldrop
Part five:  "Parables"
Looking Down, Carol Emshwiller
Newton's Sleep, Ursula K. Le Guin
Return (story), Robinson Jeffers
Endnotes characterizing the purpose of each story in the anthology

Reception 
Publishers Weekly called it "a potent mixture of prose and poetry" that will "please not only science fiction aficionados but also those with interest in philosophy, archeology and environmental ethics".

See also 

 Apocalyptic science fiction
 Science fiction

References 

1994 short story collections
Dystopian literature
Environmental fiction books
Science fiction anthologies
Utopian fiction
Tor Books books